This article details Yorkshire County Cricket Club's 2016 season. Yorkshire participated in the County Cricket Championship, Royal London One-Day Cup and the NatWest t20 Blast. This is Yorkshire's 4th consecutive season in Division One in the County Championship after receiving promotion in 2012. Yorkshire were County Champions in 2014 and 2015, however they placed third.

The club's limited overs team is called the Yorkshire Vikings. In last season's Royal London One-Day Cup the Vikings were knocked out in the semi-final by eventual winners Gloucestershire. They also finished 8th in the North Division of the NatWest t20 Blast.

Tables

County Championship, Royal One-Day Cup and NatWest T20 Blast tables to be inserted.

2016 Squad
 No. denotes the player's squad number, as worn on the back of their shirt.
  denotes players with international caps.
  denotes a player who has been awarded a county cap.

Friendlies

Two Day Match: Yorkshire vs. Lancashire

Twenty20: Yorkshire Vikings vs. Leicestershire Foxes

Twenty20 Semi-Final: Yorkshire Vikings vs. Marylebone Cricket Club

Twenty20 Final: Yorkshire Vikings vs. Lancashire Lightning

Four Day Match: Yorkshire vs. Marylebone Cricket Club

Three Day Match: Yorkshire vs. Leeds/Bradford MCCU

2016 County Championship Fixtures

Yorkshire vs. Hampshire

Warwickshire vs. Yorkshire

Nottinghamshire vs. Yorkshire

Yorkshire vs. Surrey

2016 Royal London One-Day Cup Fixtures

Yorkshire Vikings vs. Worcestershire Royals

2016 NatWest t20 Blast Fixtures

Yorkshire Vikings vs. Leicestershire Foxes

Statistics

County Championship

Most Runs

Most Wickets

Royal London One-Day Cup

Most Runs

Most Wickets

NatWest t20 Blast

Most Runs

Most Wickets

References

External links

 

2016
2016 in English cricket